Robert Forrest may refer to:

Robert Forrest (sculptor) (1790–1852), Scottish monumental sculptor
Robert Forrest (priest) (died 1908), Dean of Worcester
Robert Forrest (cricketer) (born 1993), Irish cricketer
Robert Forrest (dramatist), Scottish playwright
Robert Mervyn Forrest (1891–1975), Australian pastoralist and politician
Bob Forrest (born 1961), singer

See also

Robert Forest (disambiguation)